Oaktown may refer to:

 Oaktown, Indiana, United States
 Oaktown or Oakland, California, United States
 Oaktown (Hambach Forest), a tree-house colony by environmental activists in the Hambach Forest, Germany

See also
 Oakton (disambiguation)